Ganado Unified School District is located in Ganado, Arizona, Apache County. The district includes four schools: Ganado High School, Ganado Middle School, Ganado Intermediate School  and Ganado Primary School. Ganado Primary School is known for effectively using a holistic approach to language and culture  and as "one of the best examples of a school culture that supports professional development".

In addition to Ganado the district serves Burnside, Cornfields, Klagetoh, Steamboat, and Toyei.

Nearly 100 percent of the students in the district are Navajo, who speak Diné as their native language. Additionally 68 percent of Ganado Intermediate School's fourth, fifth, and sixth graders are classified as Limited English Proficient.

References

External links
 GUSD Website

School districts in Apache County, Arizona
Education on the Navajo Nation